William Nunnick (1877 – unknown) was an English professional footballer who played as a wing half. He played one match in the Football League for Burnley in the 1898–99 season.

References

1877 births
Year of death unknown
People from Colne
English footballers
Association football defenders
Burnley F.C. players
Nelson F.C. players
English Football League players
Trawden Forest F.C. players